The Old Guard of the City of New York is a veterans' organization and ceremonial unit in New York City.  It was consolidated in 1868 when state legislation merged the predecessor organizations the New York Light Guard (1826, founded by Col. William W. Tompkins) and the New York City Guard (1833, founded by Capt. William M. McArdle).  Its longtime headquarters was at 307 W 91st St from 1920-2016, a historic building dating from 1896 by the architect Clarence True. The unit was known for its elaborate uniforms with bearskin caps, its participation at civic events, and its annual ball. The Old Guard Headquarters are now located at 485 West 246th Street, Bronx, NY 10471.

References

American veterans' organizations
Ceremonial units and formations
Clubs and societies in New York City
Military history of New York City
Military units and formations established in 1868
1868 establishments in New York (state)